Banqiao (板桥镇) may refer to the following towns in China:

Banqiao, Fengyang County, Anhui
Banqiao, Shou County, in Shou County, Anhui
Banqiao, Chongqing, in Yongchuan District, Chongqing
Banqiao Town, Linze County, in Linze County, Gansu
Banqiao, Pan County, in Pan County, Guizhou
Banqiao, Zunyi, in Huichuan District, Zunyi, Guizhou
Banqiao, Biyang County, in Biyang County, Henan
Banqiao, Taikang County, in Taikang County, Henan
Banqiao, Enshi City, in Enshi City, Hubei
Banqiao, Nanzhang County, in Nanzhang County, Hubei
Banqiao, Changning, Hunan, in Changning City, Hunan
Banqiao Town, Shangluo, in Shangzhou District, Shangluo, Shaanxi
Banqiao, Mianzhu, in Mianzhu City, Sichuan
Banqiao, Fushun County, Sichuan, in Fushun County, Sichuan
Banqiao, Ninghe County, in Ninghe County, Tianjin
Banqiao, Luliang County, in Luliang County, Yunnan
Banqiao, Luoping County, in Luoping County, Yunnan
Banqiao, Xuanwei, in Xuanwei City, Yunnan
Banqiao, Lin'an, in Lin'an City, Zhejiang